Sona Ara Ghazaryan (born 30 March 1993) is an Armenian politician who has served as a member of the National Assembly since 2018. She is a member of the My Step Alliance.

Early life
Ghazaryan was born on  30 March 1993 in Yerevan. In 2013, she graduated from the Yerevan Brusov State University of Languages and Social Sciences.

Politics 
From September 2018 to January 2019, Ghazaryan was a member of the Yerevan Council of Elders.

On 9 December 2018, she was elected to the National Assembly as part of the My Step Alliance.

References 

Living people
1993 births
21st-century Armenian women politicians
21st-century Armenian politicians
Members of the National Assembly (Armenia)
Politicians from Yerevan